Aluitus (?-1040-?) was a medieval Galician bishop.

References

External links 

  Official web site of the Diocese of Mondoñedo-Ferrol

11th-century Galician bishops